Philip Bryden, BA (Dalhousie) 1975, BA (Jurisprudence) (Oxford) 1978, B.C.L. (Oxford) 1979, LL.M. (Harvard) 1985  is a lawyer, and Deputy Minister.  The Government of Alberta confirmed an Order in Council appointing former Dean and Professor Phil Bryden as Deputy Minister of Justice and Deputy Solicitor General effective July 6, 2015.  Before this appointment, he previously held the position of dean of law at the University of Alberta, and at the University of New Brunswick, each for five years.

References

Year of birth missing (living people)
Living people
Lawyers in New Brunswick
Canadian university and college faculty deans
Academic staff of the University of New Brunswick
Dalhousie University alumni
Canadian legal scholars
Alumni of Balliol College, Oxford
Harvard Law School alumni